The 2015 IIHF U18 World Championship Division II was a pair of international under-18 ice hockey tournaments organised by the International Ice Hockey Federation. The Division II A and Division II B tournaments represent the fourth and the fifth tier of the IIHF World U18 Championship.

Division II A
The Division II A tournament was played in Tallinn, Estonia, from 22 to 28 March 2015.

Participants

Standings

Results
All times are local. (Eastern European Time – UTC+2)

Statistics and awards

Scoring leaders 
GP = Games played; G = Goals; A = Assists; Pts = Points; +/− = Plus-minus; PIM = Penalties In Minutes
Source: IIHF.com

Goaltending leaders 
(minimum 40% team's total ice time)

TOI = Time On Ice (minutes:seconds); GA = Goals against; GAA = Goals against average; Sv% = Save percentage; SO = Shutouts
Source: IIHF.com

IIHF best player awards
 Goaltender:  Luka Valencic
 Defenceman:  Patryk Wsol
 Forward:  Lee Juhyung

Division II B
The Division II B tournament was played in Novi Sad, Serbia, from 16 to 22 March 2015.

Participants

Standings

Results
All times are local. (Central European Time – UTC+1)

Statistics and awards

Scoring leaders 
GP = Games played; G = Goals; A = Assists; Pts = Points; +/− = Plus-minus; PIM = Penalties In Minutes
Source: IIHF.com

Goaltending leaders 
(minimum 40% team's total ice time)

TOI = Time On Ice (minutes:seconds); GA = Goals against; GAA = Goals against average; Sv% = Save percentage; SO = Shutouts
Source: IIHF.com

IIHF best player awards
 Goaltender:  Alejandro Reneses
 Defenceman:  Tihamer Gyorfy
 Forward:  Lazar Lestaric

References

IIHF World U18 Championship Division II
2015 IIHF World U18 Championships
2015
2015
2014–15 in Estonian ice hockey
Ere
Sports competitions in Tallinn
March 2015 sports events in Europe
21st century in Tallinn
Sports competitions in Novi Sad
21st century in Novi Sad